Deh-e Now (also Romanized as Deh-e Now; also known as Dehnow Japlogh and Shahrak-e Valī-ye ‘Aşr) is a village in Ashna Khvor Rural District, in the Central District of Khomeyn County, Markazi Province, Iran. At the 2006 census, its population was 1,206, in 313 families.

References 

Populated places in Khomeyn County